Rubén Fernando da Silva Echeverrito (born 11 April 1968) is a retired Uruguayan footballer who played as a striker. He played for a number of clubs in Uruguay, Argentina, Spain, Italy and Mexico.

Da Silva started his career in 1986 with Danubio in the Primera División Uruguaya. In 1988, he helped the team to win the league title, contributing 23 goals, which also won him the title of topscorer.

In 1989, he moved to Argentine giants River Plate, where he was part of the team that won the Primera Division in 1988–1989.

Da Silva then moved to Italy in 1991, where he played for U.S. Cremonese before returning to River Plate in 1992, where he was topscorer in the Clausura 1993, prompting his move to CD Logroñés in Spain

In 1994 Da Silva returned to Argentina to play for River Plate's fiercest rivals, Boca Juniors.

In 1995 Da Silva left Boca to join Rosario Central, where he won the Copa Conmebol (currently known as Copa Sudamericana) in 1995, and was again topscorer of Argentina, with 15 goals in the Apertura 1997 tournament.

Da Silva had a two-year spell with UAG Tecos in Mexico before returning home to Uruguay with Club Nacional de Football in 2000. Nacional won the Primera Division in 2000, then Da Silva returned to his first club, Danubio, where he retired in 2004 after helping the club to claim the Primera division title.

Titles

Awards

References

External links
Profile at Tenfield 

1968 births
Living people
Footballers from Montevideo
Uruguayan footballers
Uruguayan people of Spanish descent
Uruguayan expatriate footballers
Association football forwards
Uruguayan Primera División players
Argentine Primera División players
La Liga players
Danubio F.C. players
Club Atlético River Plate footballers
U.S. Cremonese players
CD Logroñés footballers
Boca Juniors footballers
Rosario Central footballers
Club Nacional de Football players
Tecos F.C. footballers
Expatriate footballers in Argentina
Expatriate footballers in Italy
Uruguayan expatriate sportspeople in Argentina
Uruguayan expatriate sportspeople in Italy
Uruguay international footballers
1989 Copa América players
1995 Copa América players
1997 Copa América players
Uruguayan football managers
El Tanque Sisley managers
Copa América-winning players
C.A. Progreso managers